WWUZ is a classic rock formatted broadcast radio station licensed to Bowling Green, Virginia, serving Metro Fredericksburg.  WWUZ is owned and operated by Alpha Media LLC, through licensee Alpha Media Licensee LLC.

History
The station first took the callsign WLMN on August 23, 1991 and changed it to WWUZ on August 10, 1998.

WWUZ officially launched in October 1998 with a Classic rock format. In April 2000, the station switched to Classic Hits, branded as "96.9 the Rock". In February 2002, WWUZ changed back to its Classic Rock format, branded as "Classic Rock 96.9". On March 15, 2012, WWUZ changed its branding to "96.9 the Rock", but kept the Classic Rock format.

WWUZ was mentioned in the 15th episode of The Sopranos 6th season.

On January 23, 2015, Alpha Media "entered into a definitive agreement" to purchase WWUZ and sister stations WFLS-FM, WNTX, WVBX from Free Lance-Star License, Inc. for an unknown sum. The purchase was consummated on May 1, 2015, at a price of $8.1 million.

References

External links
96.9 The Rock Online

WUZ
Classic rock radio stations in the United States
Radio stations established in 1998
Alpha Media radio stations